Ernie Pitts (March 8, 1935 – September 24, 1970) was a Canadian Football League wide receiver and defensive back for the Winnipeg Blue Bombers and the BC Lions in a 14-year career in the CFL from 1957 to 1970. He won four Grey Cups with Winnipeg.
In August 2019 he was inducted into the Canadian Football League Hall of Fame.

College
Ernie Pitts played intercollegiate baseball and football at University of Denver.

Professional career

Winnipeg Blue Bombers
Ernie Pitts was a standout wide receiver who also played defensive back for the Winnipeg Blue Bombers from 1957 to 1969. For all those years except the last two, Ken Ploen was at quarterback. Together, along with Jim Van Pelt [1958-59], Pitts and Ploen were major factors in Winnipeg's six Grey Cup appearances (1957, 1958, 1959, 1961, 1962, 1965), including four victories: 1958, 1959, 1961, 1962 and two losses: 1957, 1965. His highest totals in caught passes was 68 in 1959 and 62 in 1962. In 1959, he scored 16 touchdowns. He once caught 5 touchdown passes in one game and scored on a 107-yard touchdown pass play. Evidence of his prowess on defense included 7 interceptions in 1968 and 5 more in 1969.

BC Lions
Pitts ended his career with the BC Lions in 1970.

Sudden death
Pitts, on September 24, 1970, was fatally shot (by a .38 caliber revolver) in the neck by his estranged wife during a domestic dispute on the porch of their home in Thornton, Colorado. They had six children. She was charged, tried for murder, and, in June 1971, acquitted, mainly for reasons of self-defense of a forcible entry by Ernie Pitts.

Family 
One of Pitts brothers, George E. Pitts (1925–1987), was an influential and longstanding newspaper entertainment columnist, notably with the Pittsburgh Courier.  One of his nephews, George Pitts (1951–2017) was a photojournalist.

External links
http://www.bcshof.org/halloffamers/pitts1980.htm
http://canoe.ca/CFLGreyCup97/nov13_taylor.html

References

1935 births
1970 deaths
American players of Canadian football
BC Lions players
Canadian football wide receivers
People from Aliquippa, Pennsylvania
University of Denver alumni
Winnipeg Blue Bombers players
Denver Pioneers football players
Canadian football defensive backs
Players of American football from Pennsylvania
Sportspeople from the Pittsburgh metropolitan area
People murdered in Colorado
Deaths by firearm in Colorado
Male murder victims
Mariticides